Suwagpur is a village in Tamulpur District, situated in north bank of river Brahmaputra, surrounded by Bangalipara , Oubari, Goreswar, Naokata and Baihata

Transport
The village is located north of National Highway 31, connected to nearby towns and cities with regular buses and other modes of transportation.

See also
 Goreswar
 Bangalipara
 Oubari
 Naokata
 Gorkha Chowk

References

Villages in Kamrup district